Idris Vicuña (born May 28, 1990), known professionally as Eyedress, is a Filipino singer-songwriter, rapper, and record producer.

Early life 
Eyedress was raised in an area in the Philippines which he described as "ghetto", and began playing the guitar at a young age. He and his family moved to Phoenix, Arizona, where he was introduced to punk music through the "gangsters" and "anarchist types" in his neighborhood. At age 13, he and his family moved to California after his father, an animator, started working with 20th Century Fox. While living in Orange County, California, he joined the crust punk band Liberal Underground as a bassist. He moved back to the Philippines at age 15 with his family. Before starting his career as a musician, he designed clothing for a brief period of time and, at age 20, he started composing music by making beats on his laptop and releasing them for free online.

Life and career
After gaining a small following from making beats, Eyedress was introduced to Filipino singer Skint Eastwood through a promoter from Manila, and the two collaborated on the song "Biolumine". The song earned him attention from a French label which pushed for him to make an album, which then earned him a record deal with Abeano Records, a subsidiary of XL Recordings. On December 2, 2013, he released his debut extended play Supernatural, which he recorded in his bedroom using FL Studio.

Eyedress released his debut mixtape, Hearing Colors, as a free digital download on April 11, 2014. He released his second EP, Egyptian Night Club to SoundCloud on July 27, 2014. In September 2014, he released the single "Polo Tee" as a tribute to American record producer DJ Rashad. He released his first mixtape after leaving XL Recordings, Shapeshifter, in 2015.

His four studio albums were released on Lex Records: Manila Ice, on May 12, 2017; Sensitive G, on November 16, 2018; Let's Skip to the Wedding on August 7, 2020 and  Mulholland Drive on August 27, 2021.

Two singles from Let's Skip to the Wedding, "Jealous" and "Romantic Lover", became viral hits on TikTok and "Jealous" was certified gold in Australia, Canada, Poland and the USA in 2021, and platinum in the USA in March 2022. "Romantic Lover" was certified gold in the USA in April 2022.

In September 2021, shortly after the album release, the first single from  Mulholland Drive, "Something About You" went viral in the US with Rolling Stone citing the track as the fastest-rising song on American streaming services for the week ending September 23. In January 2022, Eyedress was ranked at number 35 on the Billboard Emerging Artists chart. "Something About You" was certified gold in the USA in May  2022.

Discography

Studio albums

Mixtapes

Extended plays

Singles

References

1990 births
Living people
Filipino pop musicians
Musicians from Metro Manila
People from Makati
Musicians from Los Angeles
Album-cover and concert-poster artists
Filipino music video directors
Lex Records artists
Bedroom pop musicians